The longtail skate (Arhynchobatis asperrimus) is a skate and is the only member of the genus Arhynchobatis. This species was first described by  Edgar Ravenswood Waite in 1909. It is found off New Zealand at depths of from 90 to 1,000 m on the continental shelf.  Its length is from 30 to 75 cm.

Conservation status 
The New Zealand Department of Conservation has classified the longtail skate as "Data deficient" under the New Zealand Threat Classification System.

References

Rajidae
Endemic marine fish of New Zealand
Fish described in 1909